Harrisonia is a small genus of flowering plants in the subfamily Cneoroideae of the Rutaceae (citrus family). Older taxonomic treatments have placed this genus in the Simaroubaceae.

Species
Plants of the World Online currently includes:
 Harrisonia abyssinica Oliv. - Africa
 Harrisonia brownii A.Juss. - type species with a discontinuous range from the Andaman Islands to Malesia and New Guinea
 Harrisonia perforata (Blanco) Merr. - China and Indochina

References

Cneoroideae
Rutaceae genera